Max Freedom Long (October 26, 1890 – September 23, 1971) was an American novelist and New Age author.

Early life and career
Max Freedom Long was born on October 26, 1890, in Sterling, Colorado to Toby Albert Long and his wife Jessie Diffendaffer. At the time of the 1910 census he was working as a photographer in his hometown, and was living in his grandfather's household with his parents. He attended Los Angeles State Normal School from September 1914 to June 1916, and graduated with an Associate of Arts (two-year) degree in general education. After graduating, he worked briefly as an auto-mechanic in Los Angeles.

In 1917, Long moved to the island of Hawaii to teach in elementary schools around the big island. He moved to Honolulu in 1920 and lived there until 1932, while he worked in, and later owned, a photography store. In 1920, he married an English woman named Jane Jessie Rae, the proprietor of the Hotel Davenport in Honolulu. When he arrived in Hawaii, he claimed that some Native Hawaiians were practicing what he called magic. Long wrote that at first he was skeptical of this magic, but later became convinced that it worked. He devoted the rest of his life to creating theories about how the Native Hawaiians did what he claimed they did, and teaching those theories through the sale of books and newsletters.

In the mid-1930s, Long relocated to Orange County, California and began to focus on writing books inspired by his experiences in Hawaii. He married a second time while in California.

Invention of Huna

Long decided to call his compilation of teachings Huna, because one meaning of the word is "hidden secret". He wrote that he derived it from the word kahuna, meaning "priests and master craftsmen who ranked near the top of the social scale". Long published a series of books on Huna starting in 1936, and founded an organization called the Huna Fellowship in 1945.

There are no accepted Hawaiian sources – Malo, Kamakau, 'I'i, or Kepelino – that refer to the word Huna as a tradition of esoteric learning.

Max Freedom Long wrote that he obtained many of his case studies and his ideas about what to look for in kahuna magic from the Director of the Bishop Museum in Honolulu, William Brigham. There is no credible evidence that the two men met. Even if they did, Brigham was not an expert on kahunas and did not document in his own writings any of the incidents Long ascribed to him, including walking on hot lava. In his letters and manuscripts, Brigham stated that Hawaiians were "an inferior race", and implied they were lazy. He referred to Queen Lili'uokalani as a "she devil", "squaw", and "nigger".

Native Hawaiian scholar Charles W. Kenn, a Living Treasure of Hawai'i recognized in the Hawaiian community as a kahuna and expert in Hawaiian history and traditions, was friendly with Max Freedom Long but said, "While this Huna study is an interesting study, … it is not, and never was Hawaiian."

Hawaiian author Pali Jae Lee, a research librarian at the Bishop Museum, conducted extensive research on Max Freedom Long and Huna. She concluded, based on her interviews with Hawaiian elders, "Huna is not Hawaiian." Lee cites Theodore Kelsey, a Living Treasure of Hawai'i renowned for his work as a Hawaiian translator, who wrote a letter to Long in 1936 (now in the Hawai'i State Archives) criticizing his use of the terms "unihipili" and "aumakua".

Professor Lisa Kahaleole Hall writes that Huna "bears absolutely no resemblance to any Hawaiian worldview or spiritual practice" and calls it part of the "New Age spiritual industry". Huna books have been called "examples of cultural appropriation".

Later life
Max Freedom Long stopped issuing bulletins in late 1970 due to poor health. He died at his home in Vista, California on September 23, 1971, from a self-inflicted shotgun wound to his head. He had been suffering from a bone cancer for a few years at that time, and was in constant pain in his final months. He was a believer in voluntary euthanasia.

Max Freedom Long Library and Museum
Prior to his death, Long's papers and library became part of the Max Freedom Long Library and Museum at the Huna Research Center at Fort Worth, Texas. It was established by a student named Dolly Ware, who inherited Long's library. After Dolly Ware's death in 2012, parts of the collection were sold to antiquarian book dealers. Other parts became the possession of E. Otha Wingo, who was a direct successor of Long's Huna tradition. Parts of the collection of the original Library and Museum have since been reconstituted at Valdosta State University's Archives and Special Collections as part of their New Age Movements, Occultism, and Spiritualism Research Library. The remaining pieces are being sought by the curator of the collection, Guy Frost of Valdosta State University's Odum Library.

Works by Max Freedom Long

Huna related works
 Discovering the Ancient Magic, 1936
 The Secret Science Behind Miracles, 1948
 Huna Bulletins, 1948–1971
 Mana or Vital Force, 1949
 The Secret Behind Miracles, 1953
 Growing into Light, 1955
 Self-Suggestion and The New Huna Theory of Mesmerism and Hypnosis, 1958
 Psychometric Analysis, 1959
 Huna Code in Religions, 1965
 Short Talks on Huna, 1978
 Recovering the Ancient Magic, 1978 (originally published in 1936)
 What Jesus Taught in Secret, 1983
 Tarot Card Symbology, 1983

Hawaiian Detective Komako novels
 Murder Between Dark and Dark, 1939
 The Lava Flow Murders, 1940
 Death Goes Native, 1941

References

Further reading – Hawaiian traditions
 Jensen & Jensen, Daughters of Haumea (Pueo Press, 2005)
 June Gutmanis, Kahuna La'au Lapa'au:  Hawaiian Herbal Medicine (Island Heritage, 1976)
 E. S. Craighill Handy, Polynesian Religion (Kraus Reprint, 1971)
 Pali Jae Lee and Koko Willis, Tales From the Night Rainbow
 Makana Risser Chai, Na Mo'olelo Lomilomi: Traditions of Hawaiian Massage & Healing (Bishop Museum, 2005)

External links
 Official website
 Max Freedom Long Library and Museum – Description of the collection held at Valdosta State University's Archives and Special Collections
 New Age Movements, Occultism, and Spiritualism Research Library – Collection held at Valdosta State University's Archives and Special Collections

New Thought writers
1890 births
1971 suicides
Suicides by firearm in California
Deaths by euthanasia
People from Sterling, Colorado
20th-century American philosophers